The 1908–09 Yale Bulldogs men's ice hockey season was the 14th season of play for the program.

Season
After winning the Intercollegiate championship in 1908, Yale wasn't able to sustain their high level of play and started the season flat, losing five of their first six games. They recovered a bit in the middle of their schedule, albeit against weaker opponents, but sagged at the end to finish four games below .500, their worst record in 6 years.

The team did not have a coach, however, R. Seldon Rose served as team manager.

Roster

Standings

Schedule and Results

|-
!colspan=12 style="color:white; background:#00356B" | Regular Season

References

Yale Bulldogs men's ice hockey seasons
Yale
Yale
Yale
Yale